Juan Eduardo Bottaro (born 20 July 1988 in Lincoln) is an Argentine former professional footballer. He played as a striker for the Arsenal de Sarandí of the Primera División Argentina, then for Everton in Chile.

External links
 BDFA profile
 
 Argentine Primera statistics
 Profile at Terra.com.ar

1988 births
Living people
Argentine footballers
Association football forwards
Arsenal de Sarandí footballers
Everton de Viña del Mar footballers
Rivadavia de Lincoln footballers
Expatriate footballers in Chile
Argentine Primera División players
Chilean Primera División players
Torneo Argentino A players
Argentine expatriate footballers
Argentine expatriate sportspeople in Chile
People from Lincoln Partido
Sportspeople from Buenos Aires Province